The Rouse model is frequently used in polymer physics.

The Rouse model describes the conformational dynamics of an ideal chain. In this model, the single chain diffusion is represented by Brownian motion of beads connected by harmonic springs. There are no excluded volume interactions between the beads and each bead is subjected to a random thermal force and a drag force as in Langevin dynamics. This model was proposed by Prince E. Rouse in 1953. The mathematical formalism of the dynamics of Rouse model is described here. 

An important extension to include hydrodynamic interactions mediated by the solvent between different parts of the chain was worked out by Bruno Zimm in 1956. Whilst the Rouse model applies to polymer melts, the Zimm model applies to polymer in solution where the hydrodynamic interaction is not screened.  In solution, the Rouse-Zimm model predicts D~1/Nν which is consistent with the experiments. 

In a polymer melt, the Rouse model correctly predicts long-time diffusion only for chains shorter than the entanglement length. For long chains with noticeable entanglement, the Rouse model holds only up to a crossover time τe. For longer times the chain can only move within a tube formed by the surrounding chains. This slow motion is usually approximated by the reptation model.

References 

Polymer physics